Lindquistia is a genus of mites in the family Acaridae.

Species
 Lindquistia bolitotheri Mahunka, 1977

References

Acaridae